Clifton Junior Anderson (November 25, 1929 – March 16, 1979) was an American football end who played two seasons in the National Football League (NFL) with the Chicago Cardinals and New York Giants. He was drafted by the Cardinals in the 25th round of the 1952 NFL Draft. He played college football at Indiana University Bloomington and attended Cape May High School in Cape May, New Jersey.

Anderson is the grandfather of basketball player Kyle Anderson.

Head coaching record

References

External links
 Just Sports Stats

1929 births
1979 deaths
American football ends
Indiana Hoosiers football players
Chicago Cardinals players
New York Giants players
Shaw Bears football coaches
People from Cape May, New Jersey
Sportspeople from Cape May County, New Jersey
Coaches of American football from New Jersey
Players of American football from New Jersey
African-American coaches of American football
African-American players of American football
20th-century African-American sportspeople